The Kunsthalle Zürich is a contemporary art exhibition centre in Zurich, Switzerland. It is located on Limmatstrasse, near the city centre. A number of temporary exhibitions are organized each year. 

In 2014 Daniel Baumann replaced Beatrix Ruf as the director.

Their exhibition of Gilbert and George was closed early due to the COVID-19 pandemic.

Exhibitions
Some artists who have had solo exhibitions include:

See also 
 Kunsthalle

References

External links 
 Kunsthalle Zürich website 

Museums in Zürich
Contemporary art galleries in Switzerland